Phytoecia transcaspica is a species of beetle in the family Cerambycidae. It was described by Ernst Fuchs in 1955.

References

Phytoecia
Beetles described in 1955